These are the results for the 2005 edition of the HEW Cyclassics cycling classic, held in Hamburg, Germany. Filippo Pozzato ensured that the tradition that nobody has won this race twice was maintained.

General Standings

31-07-2005: Hamburg, 250 km

External links
Race website

2005
2005 UCI ProTour
2005 in German sport